USS Sarasota (APA/LPA-204) was a  that saw service with the US Navy in World War II, Korean War Era and after. She was of the VC2-S-AP5 Victory ship design type. Sarasota was named for Sarasota County, Florida.

Construction
Sarasota was laid down under Maritime Commission (MARCOM) contract, MCV hull 552, on 11 April 1944, by the Permanente Metals Corporation, Yard No. 2, Richmond, California; launched on 14 June 1944; sponsored by Mrs. Clayton L. Shaff; acquired by the Navy on 16 August 1944; and commissioned the same day.

Service history

World War II
Following shakedown, Sarasota embarked Naval Construction Battalion units and departed California on 21 October. On 9 November, she arrived in Seeadler Harbor, Manus.

Explosion of Mount Hood
Immediately afterward, Sarasotas small boats carried first aid parties to stricken ships and craft, and her sick bay took in more seriously wounded personnel for emergency treatment.

Invasion of Luzon

Two days later, the APA steamed to Hollandia and during the next week, transported troops and equipment to Biak, Mios Woendi, and Milne Bay, then returned to Manus. On 27 November, she sailed again, and after calling at Finschhafen, put into Empress Augusta Bay, Bougainville, to load units of the 2d Battalion, 129th Regimental Combat Team, 37th Infantry Division. Landing exercises at Lae followed; and, on 21 December, she returned to Manus to stage for the invasion of Luzon.

As flagship of Transport Division 8, Sarasota got underway with TU 79.3.3 on 31 December. On 8 January 1945, having survived Japanese kamikaze attacks, she approached her destination. On 9 January, she rode in Lingayen Gulf as her boats took the troops into "Crimson Beach" near the town of Lingayen.

After the landings, Sarasota steamed to Leyte, transferred casualties she had received from the beaches of Lingayen Gulf; and, on 21 January, loaded troops of the 34th Regimental Combat Team, 24th Infantry Division, in preparation for Operation Mike VII, the landing in Zambales Province, Luzon.

On 26 January, Sarasota again sailed north. Three days later, she landed the assault troops on "Blue Beach", west of San Antonio, then departed the area.

Invasion of Okinawa

Returning to Leyte, she remained through February. In March, she embarked men and equipment of the 2nd Battalion, 381st Regiment, 96th Infantry Division; conducted training operations, and, on the 27th steamed from Philippine waters.

On 1 April, she stood off the Hagushi beaches of Okinawa as her LCMs and DUKWs (popularly pronounced "duck") landed the troops on the "White Beaches". Their equipment followed and, by 4 April, Sarasota had completed offloading. She then shifted to Kerama Retto, assisted in offloading the damaged attack transport  and prepared for the assault on Ie Shima.

Invasion of Ie Shima
(Iejima (伊江島) is an island in Okinawa Prefecture, Japan, lying a few kilometers off the Motobu Peninsula of Okinawa Honto.)
On the 16th, she landed units of the 305th Regimental Combat Team on that island off the Motobu Peninsula. Manny Espinoza, Seaman, of Sarasota was wounded on the Beach, and was awarded the Purple Heart Medal. US journalist Ernie Pyle died there. There is a monument dedicated to his memory on the southern part of the island. Every year on the weekend closest to his death, 18 April, there is a memorial service.

Return to US West Coast
Three days later, she returned to the Hagushi anchorage and, on 22 April, departed the Ryūkyūs for the Marianas.

At the end of April, Sarasota disembarked Okinawa casualties at Saipan. On 2 May, she sailed for the Solomons, whence she carried general cargo, Marines, Army hospitalmen, and Navy passengers to Guam. From there, she transported casualties to Pearl Harbor; then continued on to San Francisco.

Return to Okinawa
After availability at Seattle, she embarked Army troops and, on 18 July, again headed for Okinawa. She arrived in the Hagushi anchorage on 12 August and began disembarking her reinforcement troops and, offloading her cargo. Three days later, hostilities ceased.

Operation "Magic Carpet"
On 29 August, the APA shifted to Naha to load her first contingent of occupation troops, units of the XIV Corps. On 8 September, she disembarked those troops at Jinsen, Korea. On 14 September, she returned to Okinawa, whence on 1 October, she delivered marines to Chinwangtao. Following offloading, she assumed station ship duties in the Tientsin-Taku area; and, at the end of November, she was reassigned to transport duties, this time with Operation Magic Carpet to carry servicemen back to the United States.

Sailing to Sasebo in early December, she embarked units of the 5th Marine Division and got underway for San Diego, arriving on 24 December. Between 9 January and 19 February 1946, she completed a second "Magic Carpet" run; then prepared for inactivation.

Post-World War II operations
In early March, she moved to San Francisco for overhaul; and in June, she was towed to Stockton, where she was decommissioned on 1 August and berthed with the 19th (Inactive) Fleet.

Four years later, Sarasota was ordered activated. Recommissioned on 3 February 1951, she conducted training operations and underwent alterations into June. On 20 June, she sailed for Panama; and, on 13 July, she arrived at Norfolk, Virginia, her new home port. For the remainder of 1951, the APA trained Marine Corps units in exercises off the east coast and in the Caribbean. With the new year, 1952, however, she sailed east, with units of the 8th Marines embarked, and for the next three and one-half months operated in the Mediterranean as a unit of the US 6th Fleet. Relieved on 8 May, she returned to the United States and resumed amphibious training exercises off the east coast. From May to October 1954, she again deployed to the Mediterranean. That 6th Fleet tour was again followed by training exercises, including midshipman and reservist cruises; and, in April 1955, she arrived at Atlantic Reserve Fleet, Charleston to again commence inactivation.

Final decommission
Decommissioned on 2 September 1955, she remained in reserve until transferred to MARCOM in June 1966. Her name was struck from the Navy List on 1 July. Since then, into 1974, Sarasota was still in the custody of MARCOM, berthed in the James River as a unit of the National Defense Reserve Fleet.

Fate
There appears to be some confusion as to the fate of this ship. In one Navy Vessel Register (NVR), she is listed as being disposed of in target practice on 1 November 1979. In another, she is listed as being disposed of by the Maritime Administration (MARAD) on 1 May 1982. In November 1983, the Sarasota Herald-Tribune reported that MARAD was storing the ship in the James River. In July 1988, the Sarasota Herald-Tribune reported that according to a Navy spokeswoman the ship had been sold to be scrapped overseas in 1983. According to Navsource.org and MARAD, the ship was traded out to Waterman Steamship Corporation, who resold her to Balbao Desquaces Maritimos, S.A., for scrapping, 1 August 1983. She was removed from the Reserve Fleet, 15 November 1983, and was completely scrapped by 25 April 1984.

Awards
Sarasota earned 3 battle stars during World War II.

References

Bibliography 

Online resources
 
 
 
 
 
 
Newspapers

External links

 

Haskell-class attack transports
World War II amphibious warfare vessels of the United States
Sarasota County, Florida
Ships built in Richmond, California
1944 ships
Atlantic Reserve Fleet, Charleston Group
James River Reserve Fleet